Jide Kosoko  (born 12 January 1954) is a Nigerian actor, director and producer. He was born into a royal family, hence his traditional title of prince or "omoba" in the Yoruba language.

Early life 
Prince Jide Kosoko was born in Lagos on the 12th of January 1954, to the Kosoko royal family of Lagos Island.

Career 
Prince Jide Kosoko studied business administration at the Yaba College of Technology. He began his acting career as a child actor in 1964 in a television production named Makanjuola. He has featured in several Nollywood movies in both English and Yoruba languages.

The young Jide Kosoko grew up in Ebute Metta and was inspired by the huge success of Hubert Ogunde to go into acting, when an acquaintance who was working with the Ifelodun travelling theatre troupe invited him to an audition for a role in Makanjuola, a tele-movie. Jide Kosoko accepted the invitation; he later went for the audition and was chosen for the role, playing  a character called Alabi. Kosoko continued with acting, he then performed with the Awada Kerikeri group consisting of Sunday Omobolanle, Lanre Hassan and Oga Bello, ⁣ and had guest appearances on the T.V. show, New Masquerade. In 1972, he formed his own theatre troupe.

Jide Kosoko has written and also produced his own films and stage plays including Ogun Ahoyaya. Kosoko became visible during the Video film era, producing his own film, Asiri n la in 1992, starring in Asewo to re Mecca and Tunde Kelani's Ti Oluwa Ni'Le part 2.

Endorsement

Prince Jide Kosoko is an ambassador for a popular juice production company Chivita. In 2016, he endorsed MeritAbode Limited, owners of Emerald Estate. Kosoko is also one of the brand ambassadors for Western Lotto situated in Nigeria.

Awards and nominations

In 2021, Abuja International Film Festival nominated Kosoko as the Outstanding Male Actor in Love Castle.

Personal life
Prince Jide Kosoko was married to two wives, Karimat and Henrietta, ⁣ and has children and grandchildren.

He is known to be the biological father of six children which are Bidemi, Shola, Temilade, Tunji, Muyiwa, and Tunde Kosoko.

Selected filmography
Nkan La (1992)
Oro Nla (1993)
Glamour Girls (1994)
Koseegbe (1995)
Out of Luck
The Department (2015)
Gidi Up (2014) (TV Series)
Doctor Bello (2013)
The Meeting (2012)
Last Flight to Abuja (2012)
I'll Take My Chances (2011)
The Figurine (2009)
Jenifa
The Royal Hibiscus Hotel 
Alter Ego 1 (2017) 
King of Boys (2018)
Kasala
Sugar Rush
Akpe: Return of the Beast (2019)
Merrymen (2019)
Bling Lagosians (2019)
Love is war (2019)
Shadow Parties (2020)
Breaded Life (2021)
Two Weeks in Lagos (2019)
Love Castle (2021)
The Mystic River (2021) - Nigerian Series
The Figurine (2009)
The Bling Lagosians (2019)
Breaded life (2021)
The Wildflower (2022)
House 69 (2019)
Kiki's Dilemma (2021)
More Than Just 4 Letters (2019)
Ghetto Bred (2018)
Elesin Oba, The King's Horseman (premiers in September 2022)

See also
List of Yoruba people
List of Nigerian actors
List of Nigerian singers
Yaba Higher College alumni

References

External links

Living people
Nigerian male film actors
Place of birth missing (living people)
Yoruba male actors
Male actors in Yoruba cinema
Yoruba royalty
Yaba College of Technology alumni
20th-century Nigerian male actors
21st-century Nigerian male actors
Male actors from Lagos
1954 births
Nigerian male television actors
Nigerian media personalities